The Wales national football team represents Wales in international association football and is governed by the Football Association of Wales (FAW). Between 1920 and 1939 the side played 62 matches, the majority against the other national teams of the Home Nations in the British Home Championship. The side played their first official match after the end of World War I in February 1920 on the resumption of the Home Championship, drawing 2–2 with Ireland. A draw with Scotland and a win over England, their first since 1882, in the 1919–20 tournament secured the second Home Championship in Wales' history. They won a third title in the 1923–24 British Home Championship after defeating all three opponents in the same competition for the first time.

Wales won the Home Championship again in the 1927–28 tournament but, as Football League sides became increasingly reluctant to release Welsh players for international competition, results dropped as the decade drew to a close. This culminated in the 1929–30 British Home Championship where Wales lost all three matches, conceding 17 goals whilst scoring just 2. When the Football League added further restrictions on releasing players ahead of the following tournament to avoid fixture clashes, Wales were forced to call-up a mixture of non-league and lower division players which led to the side being dubbed by media outlets as "Keenor and the ten unknowns", in reference to team captain Fred Keenor and the relative obscurity of his teammates. The side secured a draw with Scotland but suffered a 4–0 defeat to England before being replaced by the returning first team players. 

When Wales relented on hosting fixtures alongside those of the Football League, they were able to call upon their first team more frequently. This coincided with one of the most successful periods in the team's history as they won four Home Championships between 1933 and 1939, led by the goals of Dai Astley, Pat Glover and Bryn Jones. The 1938–39 British Home Championship was the final hosting of the tournament before World War II. During this period, Wales also played their first match against an opponent other than the Home Nations when they drew with France in May 1933 in Paris. The two sides also met for a second time in May 1939 in Wales' final match before the start of the war.

Of the 62 matches Wales played during this period, they recorded 22 victories: 8 against both England and Ireland, and 6 against Scotland. In the remaining 40 matches, Wales drew 15 and lost 25.

Results
Wales' score is shown first in each case. The colours listed below are also used to signify results combined with the scoreline.

Head to head records

Notes

References 
Statistics 
 
 
 

Bibliography 

Specific

1920s in Wales
1930s in Wales
1920-1939